Navahi or Nəvahi or Navahı may refer to:

Navahi, Azerbaijan
Nəvahı, Azerbaijan
Nəvahı (settlement), Azerbaijan